Highway is a solo album by Sean Delaney. Delaney's recording of this album was related to his work on Gene Simmons' and Peter Criss' solo albums. Sean used his studio musicians to record some demo material for Peter Criss that was simply released on Peter's solo album. It has also been suggested (unsubstantiated) that Casablanca president Neil Bogart used the solo album as leverage against Sean for song-writing agreements and compliance with the KISS project.

Release details
Label: Casablanca Records & Filmworks
Matrix: NBLP/NBL5-7130

Track listing
All tracks composed by Sean Delaney; except where indicated         
"Welcome to the Circus" – 4:00
"High On The Liquor of Love" – 3:07
"Somebody Love Me" – 4:10
"Baton Rouge" – 3:47
"Old Man" – 4:08
"You Beat Me to the Punch" (Ronald White, Smokey Robinson) – 3:18
"Spotlights" – 3:50
"It's Over" – 3:20
"Walk on the Water" (Delaney, Sweval) – 5:36
"Dreams" – 5:17

Personnel
Sean Delaney  - Lead Vocals, Keyboards
Neil Jason - Bass Guitar
Elliott Randall - Electric and Acoustic Guitars
Jeff "Skunk" Baxter - Electric Guitar and Pedal Steel
Paul Shaffer - Keyboards
Paul Fleischer - Saxophone
Allan Schwartzberg - Drums
Richard T. Bear - Piano on "Spotlights"
George Butcher - Piano
Julian Colbech - Organ
Lani Groves, Diva Gray, Gordon Grody, Luther Vandross, Peter Sweval, Sean Delaney, Sheenah Du Lange - Backing Vocals
Ron Frangipane - Symphonic arrangements for "Old Man" and "Dreams"
Adrienne Albert - Conductor of Gospel choir for "Walk On The Water"

Recording details
Produced by Sean Delaney and Mike Stone
Executive Producer: Mike Stone
Assistant Engineers: John Brand (Trident), Mike Frondelli (Electric Lady), Ollie Cotton (A&R)
Tape Operator: "Young" Adam Moseley (Trident)
Recorded at: Electric Lady Studio, NY, NY & A&R Studio, NY, NY
Mixed at Trident Studios, London, England
Mastered at: Sterling Sound, "At Night" with George Marino, NY, NY
Cover painting: George Derpapas
Dedicated to: GUI, GENE, PAUL, ACE, & PETER

Sean Delaney (musician) albums
1979 debut albums
Casablanca Records albums